The Catadupa Beds is a geologic formation in Jamaica. It preserves fossils dating back to the Cretaceous period.

See also

 List of fossiliferous stratigraphic units in Jamaica

References
 

Cretaceous Jamaica